The Kaimai hydro power scheme is a hydroelectric power scheme on the Wairoa River in the Bay of Plenty in New Zealand. The scheme is operated by TrustPower. It has four operational power stations, and formerly the McLaren Falls Station which was decommissioned in 1989 following the commissioning of the Ruahihi Station.

Power stations
McLaren Falls Station 750 kW - decommissioned
Lloyd Mandeno Station 16 MW
Ruahihi Station 20 MW
Lower Mangapapa Station 5.6 MW
Kaimai 5 Station 0.3 MW

See also
 Hydroelectric power in New Zealand

References

Hydroelectricity in New Zealand
Buildings and structures in the Bay of Plenty Region
Bay of Plenty Region